Anne Rasmussen or Anna Rasmussen may refer to:

 Anna Rasmussen, (1898–1983), Danish spiritualist medium
 Anne Rasmussen (politician) (born 1971) Danish politician
 Anne Rasmussen (educator), (born 1959) American educator
 Ann-Helen Rasmussen  (born 1990) Samoan New Zealand netball player